Delairea is a plant genus within the family Asteraceae that is native to South Africa. Classified within the tribe Senecioneae, it contains only one species, Delairea odorata, which was previously included in the genus Senecio as Senecio mikanioides. It is known as Cape ivy in some parts of the world (US) and German ivy in others (Britain, Ireland). Other names include parlor ivy and Italian ivy. Its multi-lobed leaves somewhat resemble those of the unrelated English ivy. 

Originally used as an ornamental plant on trellises and as groundcover, it is now rarely cultivated because of its invasiveness, in addition to being a weed.

Description 

Though it can also form mats. The plant emits a distinguishing odor when crushed and it also occurs during flowering, hence its species name "odorata" (which means 'fragrant').

Its stems are usually purplish when young and fragile, where they turn green and somewhat succulent. They finally become creamy-brown and slightly woody as they age. The upper leaf surfaces are light green, but usually somewhat purple-hinted, while the undersurface are somewhat silvery.

The plant's stems and leaves die off between late summer and early autumn, but are superseded by new shoots that employ the old stems as climbing support.

Inflorescence
Its sweet-scented discoid flowers are yellow, which lack the petal-like ray florets found in typical daisies. They have tiny tubular florets surrounded by a row (i.e. involucre) of 8-10 small green bracts ( long). Flowering occurs mostly during winter to early spring.

Most of its seed in North America and possibly elsewhere are unviable, which may be the deficiency of effective pollinators.

Habitat and distribution
The plant is actually uncommon in its native country of South Africa, where it was originally found in the Drakensberg Mountains, on forest edges, at elevations above . Its occurrence at the more coastal areas (some of which are arid) in South Africa is probably more recent. In California, it is generally found in the fog belt on the coast, with a few specimens found inland, particularly in riparian sites that feature permanent moisture. It is found in wetter temperate regions, but it may still be found in cooler subtropical environments, although it is frost tender. It prefers partial shade, but can withstand heavy shade. In more damp areas, it can prosper in full sun. Despite its invasive nature, the plant is grown as an ornamental houseplant for its foliage.

Ecological impact  
Delairea odorata has become an invasive species in coastal California starting in 1892, Hawaii, coastal Oregon, New Zealand and southern Australia (particularly in Victoria). The plant will cover shrubs and trees, inhibiting growth and will also cover ground intensively over a wide area, thereby preventing seeds from germinating or growing. It is also toxic to animals who eat it and to fish where it trails into waterways. 

The vine reaches maturity in 2 years and it can produce over 30,000 seeds annually. In Hawaii an introduced species of moth (Galtara extensa) for the biological control of Senecio madagascariensis  both originally from Madagascar  proved to feed also on D.odorata.

It is presently known only from the same South African native range of the host. Due to the pathogen's effects  especially its leaf spot disease  they advocate C.delaireae as a potential biocontrol of the vine in its invasive ranges.

Another organism from its native range, the moth Digitivalva delaireae, also can be used as a biocontrol. Mehelis et al., 2015 test its food preferences and find it is very selective for D.odorata. Because it avoids any vulnerable native plants in California and Oregon it is a good choice specifically to control the infestations there.

There is a report in California by a man who claimed that after walking through a clump of Cape ivy in his ranch, whilst in full blooms, he became lightheaded, fainted and had a seizure. Before this, he had coughing fits while trying to eradicate the plant, which was not in flower at the time.

Cultivation

Germany ivy is grown as a vine or groundcover, where it can vigorously climb up posts, hedges, trees and shrubs, fences, banks, and walls. The plant is cultivated in landscaping for its ivy-like leaves and scented flowers in bright light or light shade away from abundant sunlight. Propagation is done by cuttings as its stems root readily both in water and soil, without the need for a rooting hormone. In addition to being drought-tolerant, it cannot withstand soggy soils. When overwatered, its leaves turn brown and have curled edges. Conversely, underwatering will cause its leaves to fall. Pruning is encouraged for a bushy and compact growth. Pests include mealy bugs and aphids, and diseases include leaf spot and root rot.

History
The plant was introduced to the United States in the 19th century as a Victorian era-style houseplant. In the 1850s, in Geelong, the plant was described in the Geelong Advertiser, "the great stumps, over which the little boys played leap-frog, are either gone or covered with the Cape ivy". Furthermore, 1856 and 1864 columns in the Sydney Morning Herald mention a Cape Ivy observed on the dunes at Newcastle, New South Wales and Gulaga. In 1909, it was introduced as an ornamental to Kailua-Kona, Hawaii. Neal (1965) describes the plant as, "both a weed and an ornamental."

Related species

The name Cape ivy is also used ambiguously for Senecio angulatus, a different but related creeper. S. angulatus has been incorrectly listed as a synonym to D. odorata historically, and these species have been confused regularly despite the visual differences. A feature that distinguishes it from S. angulatus are the small ear-shaped appendages at the base of the stalks of the leaves, its intertwining habit, and its flowers which do not have obvious 'petals', whereas S. angulatus and S. tamoides have daisy-like flowers. Moreover, S. angulatus is more of a scrambler, whereas S. tamoides and Delairea grow more like true vines. Atlas of Living Australia has also misapplied S. tamoides for its D. odorata observations in Australia.

Gallery

References

Bibliography

External links

 

Senecioneae
Monotypic Asteraceae genera
Flora of South Africa
Vines
Groundcovers
Creepers of South Africa
Garden plants of Southern Africa
Invasive plant species in the United States